"Out West" (stylized in all caps) is a song released American record label Cactus Jack Records, known as JackBoys, performed by leader American rapper Travis Scott featuring fellow American rapper Young Thug. It was sent to rhythmic contemporary radio on February 18, 2020, as the third single from the compilation album, JackBoys (2019), by the lead artists. In late December 2019, shortly after the release of JackBoys, TikTok star Nicole Bloomgarden created the "Out West Challenge" and the dance challenge went viral on TikTok in February 2020.

Music video 
The music video was released on March 20, 2020. It was co-directed by Travis Scott alongside White Trash Tyler and shows a house party with women twerking while Young Thug performs above the crowd. The scene then heads to the bathroom, where a girl is found passed out by the toilet and Quincy Jones is washing his face and hands. He also appears in the end of the clip walking around with a sandwich and eating it.

The video features cameos from Cactus Jack artists Sheck Wes, Don Toliver, Luxury Tax and Chase B. Rappers 21 Savage, Yung Kayo and Young Jordan appear in the video as well; the latter two are signed to Young Thug's record label YSL Records.

Charts

Weekly charts

Year-end charts

Certifications

References 

2020 singles
2019 songs
Travis Scott songs
Young Thug songs
Epic Records singles
Cactus Jack Records singles
Songs written by Travis Scott
Songs written by Young Thug
Songs written by Buddah Bless
Song recordings produced by Buddah Bless